Mi Senti (Italian for "you hear me" or "you feel me") is an EP released by Irish electronic musician Róisín Murphy in May 2014. The extended play, the physical edition of which is a limited issue of 1000 copies, was released by The Vinyl Factory. It consists of covers of classic Italian pop songs as well as an original track entitled "In sintesi" produced by long-time musical collaborator Eddie Stevens. Two remix bundles of the album (available as a digital download and 12" vinyl) were released on 25 June and 10 September respectively.

Murphy commented on the official site for the EP that she "does not speak a word of Italian", admitting that although aided by her partner, Italian producer Sebastiano Properzi, "the correct pronunciation of the words along with understanding and conveying the meaning was difficult and tedious". She credited the songs with inspiring her to "exercise" her vocals and make them "bigger". Murphy also felt that her role in music is as a muse for the people she works with and highlighted this dynamic as affecting the recording of the EP, calling it a "natural disposition" for her since her days as part of Moloko.

Track listing
"Ancora ancora ancora" (original by Mina) – 5:37
"Pensiero stupendo" (original by Patty Pravo) – 4:11
"Ancora tu" (original by Lucio Battisti) – 5:07
"In sintesi" – 5:04
"Non credere" (original by Mina) – 4:37
"La gatta" (original by Gino Paoli) – 3:29

References

2014 EPs
Italian-language EPs
Róisín Murphy albums